Sarah Hassan (born 5 September 1988) is a Kenyan actress, model and former TV host who has appeared in several films and television series. She is notable for her role in Citizen TV series such as, Tahidi High,The Wedding Show and Zora.

Early life
Sarah Hassan was born on September 5,1988 in Mombasa, Kenya as the only child of her parents. Early on in life, she started acting at the age of five. For her secondary school education, she went to Machakos Girls' High School and later joined Jomo Kenyatta University of Agriculture and Technology, where she pursued a Bachelors of Science in Actuarial Science.

Career
Hassan made her debut on TV in 2009 as Tanya, on the Kenyan high-school drama series Tahidi High and became one of the lead characters at the time. She also starred in several series; Demigods, Saints and Changes, and even went on to host the East African Dance show Sakata Mashariki. In 2013 she took over Noni Gathoni's role in The Wedding Show as the main host until December 2014. Besides acting, she is a brand ambassador to several Kenyan fashion lines. She is currently based in Nairobi, Kenya.

Personal life 
Sara Hassan married to Martin Dale on February 25, 2017 and together they have a son.

Filmography

Awards

References

External links
 

Living people
Kenyan television actresses
Kenyan film actresses
1988 births
People from Mombasa
Jomo Kenyatta University of Agriculture and Technology alumni
21st-century Kenyan actresses